Sayong is a small village in Perak, Malaysia. It is famous for a traditional craft known as Labu Sayong, earthenware, gourd-shaped jars for keeping drinking water cool.

Villages in Perak